Kromskoy District is an administrative and municipal district (raion), one of the twenty-four in Oryol Oblast, Russia. It is located in the southwest of the oblast. Its administrative center is the urban locality (an urban-type settlement) of Kromy. Population: 21,346 (2010 Census);  The population of Kromy accounts for 31.5% of the district's total population.

References

Notes

Sources

Districts of Oryol Oblast